First Kill may refer to:
 First Kill (2017 film), an American film
 First Kill (compilation), a 1986 compilation album by Tygers Of Pan Tang
 First Kill (2001 film), a Dutch documentary film
 "First Kill", a song by Amon Amarth on the 2016 album Jomsviking
 "Chuck Versus the First Kill", a 2009 episode of Chuck
 First Kill (TV series), a 2022 supernatural teen drama television series